The 1969-70 season was Chelsea Football Club's 56th of competitive football, and the club's 43rd in the English top flight.

The club began the season having not signed a single player. Defender Paddy Mulligan, who joined in October for £17,500, was the sole recruit during the campaign. Bobby Tambling spent his final season with the club. He moved to Crystal Palace on loan in January before leaving permanently in May. Tambling departed as Chelsea's all-time top goalscorer, a record he held until 2013 when his tally of 202 goals was surpassed by Frank Lampard.

The season proved to be a success, as the club won the FA Cup for the first time in their history with a hard-fought replayed win over Leeds United. The club also finished 3rd in the First Division, their highest placing since 1965. Chelsea were for a time in title contention, although an indifferent start and heavy defeats at the hands of rivals Leeds and Everton ultimately ended their chances.

Midfielders John Hollins and Peter Houseman did not miss a game. Hollins was also voted Chelsea's Player of the Year by the fans. Peter Osgood finished as top scorer, with 31 goals in all competitions, and became the last man to date to score in every round of the FA Cup. The average home attendance for the season was 40,342.

Squad statistics

Substitute appearances in parenthesis. Substitute appearances included in totals

Results

First Division

League Cup

FA Cup

Notes

References

Soccerbase
Hockings, Ron. 100 Years of the Blues: A Statistical History of Chelsea Football Club. (2007)

Chelsea F.C. seasons
Chelsea